Elina Svitolina was the defending champion, but lost to Sloane Stephens in the semifinals.

World No. 1 Simona Halep won the title, defeating Stephens in the final, 7–6(8–6), 3–6, 6–4.

Seeds
The top eight seeds received a bye into the second round.

Draw

Finals

Top half

Section 1

Section 2

Bottom half

Section 3

Section 4

Qualifying

Seeds

Qualifiers

Lucky loser
  Monica Puig

Draw

First qualifier

Second qualifier

Third qualifier

Fourth qualifier

Fifth qualifier

Sixth qualifier

Seventh qualifier

Eighth qualifier

Ninth qualifier

Tenth qualifier

Eleventh qualifier

Twelfth qualifier

References

External links
Main draw
Qualifying draw

Women's Singles
2018 in Canadian women's sports